Nordic combined at the 1968 Winter Olympics consisted of one event, held from 10 February to 12 February at Autrans.

Medal summary

Medal table

Events

Individual

Athletes did three normal hill ski jumps, with the lowest score dropped. They then raced a 15 kilometre cross-country course, with the time converted to points. The athlete with the highest combined points score was awarded the gold medal.

Participating NOCs
Thirteen nations participated in Nordic combined at the Grenoble Games.

References

External links
 Sports-Reference - 1968 Olympics - Nordic Combined - Individual

 
1968 Winter Olympics events
1968
1968 in Nordic combined
Nordic combined competitions in France
Men's events at the 1968 Winter Olympics